The Lale Cup was a tournament for professional female tennis players who played on outdoor hardcourts. The event was classified as a $60,000 ITF Women's Circuit tournament and was held in Istanbul, Turkey, annually, from 2013 to 2019.

Past finals

Singles

Doubles

External links
 ITF search

 
ITF Women's World Tennis Tour
Hard court tennis tournaments
Tennis tournaments in Turkey
Recurring sporting events established in 2013
2013 establishments in Turkey